Hyaluronan synthase 1 is an enzyme that in humans is encoded by the HAS1 gene.

Structure

Hyaluronan or hyaluronic acid (HA) is a high molecular weight unbranched polysaccharide synthesized by a wide variety of organisms from bacteria to mammals, and is a constituent of the extracellular matrix.  It consists of alternating glucuronic acid and N-acetylglucosamine residues that are linked by beta-1-3 and beta-1-4 glycosidic bonds.  HA is synthesized by membrane-bound synthase at the inner surface of the plasma membrane, and the chains are extruded via ABC-transporter into the extracellular space.

Function
It serves a variety of functions, including space filling, lubrication of joints, and provision of a matrix through which cells can migrate.  HA is actively produced during wound healing and tissue repair to provide a framework for ingrowth of blood vessels and fibroblasts.  Changes in the serum concentration of HA are associated with inflammatory and degenerative arthropathies such as rheumatoid arthritis.  In addition, the interaction of HA with the leukocyte receptor CD44 is important in tissue-specific homing by leukocytes, and overexpression of HA receptors has been correlated with tumor metastasis.  HAS1 is a member of the newly identified vertebrate gene family encoding putative hyaluronan synthases, and its amino acid sequence shows significant homology to the hasA gene product of Streptococcus pyogenes, a glycosaminoglycan synthetase (DG42) from Xenopus laevis, and a recently described murine hyaluronan synthase.

References

Further reading

EC 2.4.1